Dendrobium callitrophilum, commonly known as the thin feather orchid, is an epiphytic orchid in the family Orchidaceae with narrow pseudobulbs, one or two thin, leathery leaves and up to six greenish yellow flowers with a cream-coloured or apricot-coloured labellum. It grows in or near rainforest in isolated parts of tropical North Queensland.

Description 
The side lobes of the labellum are erect and pointed and the middle lobe turns downwards with three ridges, the central ridge larger and wavy. Flowering occurs from August to September.

Taxonomy and naming
Dendrobium callitrophilum was first formally described in 1989 by Bruce Gray and David Jones from a specimen collected near  Nitchigar Creek, near Tully Falls. The description was published in the Proceedings of the Royal Society of Queensland.

Distribution and habitat
The thin feather orchid grows on trees and shrubs, favouring Callitris macleayana and Austromyrtus species.

Conservation
This orchid is listed as "vulnerable" under the Australian Government Environment Protection and Biodiversity Conservation Act 1999. Although some populations of the species are conserved in national parks, it is threatened by land clearing, changed fire regimes and illegal collecting.

References

callitrophilum
Orchids of Queensland
Plants described in 1873